Aegri Somnia is a 2008 Canadian existential horror film, written and directed by James Rewucki. Shot in a mixture of black and white and colour, Aegri Somnia tells the story of Edgar (Tyhr Trubiak), a simple man who is haunted by the death of his wife Muriel (Mel Marginet) and plagued by shadows and terrifying visions.

Plot
Edgar is a man in an extreme existential crisis. He is thrown into a hopeless abyss of frequent nightmares, isolation and increasing paranoia following the suicide of his wife. Edgar moves from one fresh hell into another in this tale of a man facing the darkest side of his shadow self.

Cast

Reception
Horror News said of the film, "Just because something wants to be art, and works really hard to be worthy, doesn’t mean it’s necessarily  going to be artistic and worthy."

References

External links
 

2008 horror films
2008 films
2000s English-language films